Joseph Michael MacDonagh (18 May 1883 – 25 December 1922) was an Irish Sinn Féin politician. 

He was born in Cloughjordan, County Tipperary. His parents Joseph MacDonagh and Mary Parker were both national schoolteachers. His brothers included the executed 1916 Easter Rising leader Thomas MacDonagh and film director John MacDonagh. He was educated in his father's school in Cloughjordan, and at Rockwell College.

He was elected unopposed as a Sinn Féin MP for the Tipperary North constituency at the 1918 general election. In January 1919, Sinn Féin MPs refused to recognise the Parliament of the United Kingdom and instead assembled at the Mansion House in Dublin as a revolutionary parliament called Dáil Éireann, though MacDonagh did not attend as he was in prison. He was elected unopposed as a Sinn Féin Teachta Dála (TD) for the Tipperary Mid, North and South constituency at the 1921 elections. He also served as an alderman of Rathmines Urban District Council and Dublin Corporation between 1920 and 1922.

He was Director of the "Belfast Boycott", an attempt in 1920–1921 to boycott goods from Ulster that were being imported into the south of Ireland. He opposed the Anglo-Irish Treaty and voted against it. He was re-elected for the same constituency at the 1922 general election, this time as an anti-Treaty Sinn Féin TD, but he did not take his seat in the Dáil. He died, while on hunger strike, from the effects of a burst appendix, on 25 December 1922.

References

External links
 

1883 births
1922 deaths
People from Cloughjordan
Early Sinn Féin TDs
Members of the 1st Dáil
Members of the 2nd Dáil
Members of the 3rd Dáil
Members of the Parliament of the United Kingdom for County Tipperary constituencies (1801–1922)
UK MPs 1918–1922
Politicians from County Tipperary
People educated at Rockwell College
Joseph